Vladimir Petrovich Demikhov (July 31, 1916 – November 22, 1998) was a Soviet scientist and organ transplantation pioneer, who performed several transplants in the 1940s and 1950s, including the transplantation of a heart into an animal and a heart–lung replacement in an animal. He is also well known for his dog head transplants, which he conducted during the 1950s, resulting in two-headed dogs. This ultimately led to the head transplants in monkeys by Dr. Robert White, who was inspired by Demikhov's work.

Early life
Vladimir P. Demikhov was born on July 31, 1916, into a family of Russian peasants living on a small farmstead in the northern part of Russia's Volgograd region. His father, Demikhov Peter Yakovlevich, was killed during the Russian Civil War when Demikhov was about three years old, so he and his brother and sister were raised by their mother, Domnika Alexandrovna, who managed to provide them with a good education. He began to show an interest in the mammalian circulatory system as a teenager, and is also known to have been inspired by Pavlov's experimental work with dogs. When he left school in 1931, his first job was at the Stalingrad Tractor Plant where he worked as a mechanic and repairman.

In 1934, Demikhov began studying at the Voronezh State University, where in 1937 he created the world's first artificial heart and successfully implanted it into a dog (which survived for two hours after the surgery). A description of this groundbreaking work was published in April 1938 in the university's student newspaper, and it was presented to the other students at a scientific conference the following month. He then transferred to the Biology Faculty of Moscow State University, where he wrote his first scientific work, and graduated with honors in August 1940.

Soon after graduation, Demikhov was conscripted into military service and became a soldier in the Red Army; when the Soviet Union was drawn into the Second World War in June 1941, he served on the front line as a forensic expert and pathologist, and spent time serving in China when the Soviets declared war on Japan in 1945. He returned home at the end of the war with a number of medals and a military decoration. He married Liya Nikolayevna in August 1946, and their daughter Olga was born in July 1947.

Career
After the war, Demikhov resumed his post in the human physiology department at Moscow State University, where he continued his experimental research, eventually performing successful heart and lung transplants on warm-blooded animals. In 1947, he moved to the Institute of Surgery in Moscow where he began to experiment with liver and kidney transplantation in the late 1940s.

He spent the 1950s carrying out research into organ transplantation surgery, continuously improving his experimental techniques. He successfully performed an isolated orthotopic heart transplantation in a dog in 1951 (where the heart was correctly positioned rather than offset inside the thoracic cavity). The survival rates steadily increased from a few hours to several weeks, and one of the dogs that received a heart transplant in 1953 survived for another seven years after the operation.
A successful mammary–coronary artery anastomosis was achieved in 1953, after unsuccessful attempts the previous year. Demikhov also developed the principles of myocardial revascularization, which enabled him to perform the first experimental coronary artery bypass operation. The ultimate aim of his research was for organ transplantations to be implemented in clinical practice on humans.

In February 1954, in arguably his most bizarre experiment, he transplanted a dog's head onto another dog, using vascular connections to the host dog's heart. Ignoring the condemnation from his critics, he continued with this particular line of experimentation, becoming more successful with time. His transplantation work was widely reported inside the Soviet Union, where it was continuously criticized for being unethical, but it was not until the late 1950s that news of his experiments spread to the outside world. In fact, by the time American surgeons became aware of Demikhov's dog head transplantations in 1959, he had already been performing these procedures for five years.

Demikhov coined the word "transplantology", meaning organ transplantation, in his 1960 monograph Experimental Transplantation of Vital Organs, for which he received his doctoral degree. Later translated into English (1962), German (1963) and Spanish (1967), this became a hugely influential publication for physicians interested in the emerging field of organ and tissue transplantation, and was for some considerable time the only monograph on the subject.

He joined the Sklifosovsky Institute of Emergency Medicine in 1960, where he remained until his retirement in 1986. His main goal was to push for the introduction into routine surgical practice of vital organ transplantation in humans, using "revitalized" (living) organs rather than artificial ones. Demikhov's ideas were initially met with a huge degree of skepticism but he maintained a calm demeanor and was able to field all questions that were thrown at him by his critics. Eager to share his ideas and findings with other medical professionals from around the world, he was always happy to welcome visitors to his laboratory to witness his experiments. U.S. physicians started to learn about his innovative techniques in the 1960s, when many of them traveled to the Soviet Union to watch Soviet surgeons at work. By 1962, the opinion of the American medical community had shifted and they gradually warmed to the idea of one day successfully transplanting human organs.

One particular admirer of his work was South African cardiac surgeon Christiaan Barnard, who became convinced through studying Demikhov's experiments that human heart transplantation was a real possibility. Barnard twice visited Demikhov's laboratory in Moscow, in 1960 and 1963, and inspired by his observations there, he successfully performed the world's first heart transplant operation from one person to another in 1967. He would later credit Demikhov's earlier experiments for making all this possible, calling him "[the] father of heart and lung transplantation".

Scientific contribution
Demikhov is perhaps most famous for his two-headed dog experiments. He achieved a substantial number of world's firsts:

 1937 – first cardiac assist device (artificial heart)
 1946 – first intrathoracic heterotopic heart transplant (into chest cavity)
 1946 – first heart–lung transplant
 1947 – first lung transplant
 1948 – first liver transplant
 1951 – first orthotopic (correctly positioned) heart transplant
 1952 – first mammary–coronary anastomosis
 1953 – first successful experimental coronary artery bypass operation
 1954 – first head transplant

All of the surgical procedures listed above were carried out on warm-blooded animals (non-human). Between 1963 and 1965, he also assembled the world's first collection of living human organs for surgical use.

Death
Demikhov died at the age of 82 on November 22, 1998, as the result of an aneurysm, in his small apartment on the outskirts of Moscow. Although he had received various honors later in life, including a USSR State Prize, the true value of Demikhov's experiments was not acknowledged by Russia until the year of his death, when he was awarded the Order of Merit for the Fatherland, 3rd class, shortly before he died.

Trivia
According to a study conducted in 2015, Demikhov was included in "Russia team on medicine". This list includes fifty-three famous Russian medical scientists from the Russian Federation, the Soviet Union, and the Russian Empire who were born in 1757—1950. Physicians of all specialities listed here. Among them Vladimir Bekhterev, Sergei Korsakoff, Ivan Pavlov, Nikolay Pirogov, Victor Skumin.

See also 
Experiments in the Revival of Organisms – Russian documentary that depicts similar experiments carried out in the Soviet Union

References

Bibliography

External links 
 ASMO-press biography of Vladimir Demikhov
 The 20 Most Bizarre Experiments of All Time (archive) from The Proceedings of the Athanasius Kircher Society
 Top 10 Mad Scientists in History, Bored? Look no further (2018)
 How Vladimir Demikhov Actually Made A Two-Headed Dog, All That's Interesting (January 15, 2018)

Soviet scientists
Animal testing in the Soviet Union
Russian inventors
1916 births
1998 deaths
Recipients of the Order "For Merit to the Fatherland", 3rd class
Recipients of the USSR State Prize
Soviet inventors
Soviet surgeons
People from Don Host Oblast
People from Novonikolayevsky District
Moscow State University alumni
Soviet military personnel of World War II
20th-century surgeons
Soviet military doctors